Tajan is an uninhabited islet in Croatia, part of the Elaphiti Islands archipelago off the coast of southern Dalmatia, near Dubrovnik. It is located near the island of Jakljan. Its area is 0.111 km2 and its coastline is 1.41 km long.

References

Islands of Croatia
Islands of the Adriatic Sea
Uninhabited islands of Croatia
Elaphiti Islands